Icaria Planum is a region on Mars in the Thaumasia quadrangle of Mars that is 566.59 km across and is located at 43.27 S and 
253.96E.  It was named after a classic albedo feature that was approved in 1979.  The name of the classic feature was based on the land where according to greek mythology, Icarus died (Icaria).

See also

 HiRISE
 HiWish program
 Latitude dependent mantle
 Thaumasia quadrangle

References

Thaumasia quadrangle